Graham's frog (Odorrana grahami) – also known as the diskless-fingered odorous frog – is a species of frog in the family Ranidae. It is found in China (Sichuan, Yunnan, Guizhou, and possibly Hunan) and Vietnam (in Hoàng Liên National Park in the north). Presumably it is also found in Myanmar in areas adjacent to its Chinese distribution area.

Habitat
Its natural habitats are subtropical or tropical moist montane forests, subtropical or tropical dry shrubland, temperate grassland, subtropical or tropical seasonally wet or flooded lowland grassland, rivers, and freshwater marshes. It is becoming rare due to habitat loss.

Description
Odorrana grahami is a relatively large frog, with males reaching  and females  in length.

The skin secretions of Odorrana grahami have been subject to biochemical studies, yielding for example antimicrobial peptides.

References 

grahami
Amphibians described in 1917
Amphibians of China
Amphibians of Vietnam
Taxonomy articles created by Polbot